Marsha Hanen,  (September 18, 1936 – April 13, 2019) was a Canadian academic and former university administrator. She was President and Vice Chancellor of the University of Winnipeg from 1989 to 1999.

She received a Bachelor of Arts degree and a Master of Arts degree in Philosophy from Brown University and a Ph.D. from Brandeis University.

In 1998, she was made a Member of the Order of Canada in recognition for being "an inspiration to women in education, encouraging attitudinal change and innovation among academics, business leaders and law makers".

References

1936 births
2019 deaths
Brandeis University alumni
Brown University alumni
Presidents of the University of Winnipeg
Members of the Order of Canada